91st Street station may refer to:

91st Street station (IRT Broadway–Seventh Avenue Line)
91st Street station (Hudson–Bergen Light Rail)
91st Street (South Chicago) station
91st Street (Chesterfield) station